Inland is the eleventh full-length studio album by rock band Jars of Clay, which was released on August 27, 2013, by Gray Matters label. The album was produced by Tucker Martine at Flora Recording & Playback in Portland, Oregon. It has seen significant charting successes, and has garnered critical acclamation. It was nominated for Rock/Contemporary Album of the Year by the GMA Dove Awards.

Background
The album was recorded in Portland, Oregon at Flora Recording & Playback in July 2012 by the band, and it was produced by Tucker Martine.

Release and promotion
The album was released on August 27, 2013, by Gray Matters label. The song "Love in Hard Times" was packaged with the purchase their EP entitled Under the Weather (Live in Sellersville, PA), and this occurred on March 18, 2013. "Inland" was released as a promotional single by the band through Rolling Stone on June 17, 2013, which was free to download. On June 18, 2013, the band released the lead single "After the Fight" from the album. On August 20, 2013, Jars of Clay allowed Billboard to stream the album.

Critical reception

Inland garnered universal critical acclaim by music critics. Andy Argyrakis of CCM Magazine told that "the group continues pushing creative and lyrical boundaries eleven albums later. Rather than taking the safe and easy radio route, the group turns to producer Tucker Martine [...] for a hipster friendly journey of melodic pop treasures that candidly discuss life's many emotions during uncertain times." At New Release Tuesday, Kevin Davis noted the album for its "beauty and transparency", and stated that the release "is 'All it was meant to be.'" Roger Gelwicks of Jesus Freak Hideout called the album "essential listening" that the release "demonstrates that the band's identity rests in revitalizing change", and how the band has "stayed incredibly fascinating" in their musical longevity makes this "all the more impressive." In addition, Gelwicks noted this album as being "Original at the core and rooted in practiced experience". At Indie Vision Music, Ian Zandi told that he would "put this record on par with their classic self-titled album and The Long Fall Back to Earth."

At The Phantom Tollbooth, Bert Gangl proclaimed this to be "An absolutely brilliant artistic statement and arguably the band's most compelling offering to date, Inland has, at long last, equaled the quartet's landmark debut and taken its place as the new benchmark against which all of its successive efforts should be measured." Derek Walker of The Phantom Tollbooth told that "Inland doesn't quite match the spacious beauty of their début or the synth-rich intricate layers of The Long Fall Back to Earth, both of which are 5-Tock [five-star] works, but it is a melody-fuelled work, rich in lyrical imagery, that succeeds both as an introduction to the band and as a satisfying addition to their canon for long-time fans." Also, Scott Mertens of The Phantom Tollbooth felt that "The beauty of Inland is how the independent songs meld together to create story. This is the mark of a fine piece of art. As a whole, the message is not only intact but has a greater meaning."

Calvin Moore of The Christian Manifesto felt that "Inland offers what has always made this a great band: thoughtful, honest, hard-pressed questions, lyrics that present the beautiful struggle, and music that draws the listener into the longing for more." In addition, Moore noted that "Jars of Clay still makes stellar music", and he told that "A little consistency in a world full of inconsistency is never a bad thing." At Louder Than the Music, Jono Davies evoked how the release "is full of hit after hit". Julia Kitzing of CM Addict told that she was "not hearing strong references to their faith." At The Christian Music Review Blog, Jim Wilkerson stated that "If you are looking for a collection of songs that will not only be satisfying to the ears, but also make you think, then I am sure Inland will do the trick." Rob Snyder of Alpha Omega News graded the album an A, which he affirmed "Good luck finding vertical lyrics but I do love the intelligence of the lyrics; words to make you think without any one dropping f-bombs or relaying on tried and trite tirades", yet he called this "Strong stuff and worthy of your attention."

Commercial performance
For the Billboard charting week of September 14, 2013, Inland reached No. 70 on the Billboard 200, No. 2 on Top Christian Albums, No. 14 on Top Independent Albums, and No. 20 on Top Rock Albums.

Track listing

Personnel 
Jars of Clay
 Dan Haseltine – lead vocals, handclaps (4)
 Charlie Lowell – pianos, keyboards, backing vocals, handclaps (4)
 Stephen Mason – guitars, backing vocals, handclaps (4)
 Matt Odmark – guitars, backing vocals, handclaps (4)

Additional musicians
 Adrian Belew – guitars (1)
 Matt Chamberlain – drums
 Michael Finn – handclaps (4)
 Mitch Dane – vibraslap (12)
 Nathaniel Smith – cello (9)
 Jeremy Kittel – viola (2, 6, 7, 9), violin (2, 6, 7, 9), string arrangements (2, 6, 7, 9)
 John Mark Painter – horns (12), arrangements (12)

Production
 Tucker Martine – producer, engineer
 Jacquire King – mixing (1, 2, 4, 10)
 Beau Sorenson – mixing (3, 5-9, 11, 12)
 Roger Seibel – mastering at SAE Mastering, Phoenix, Arizona
 Wayne Brezinka – art direction, design, layout
 David Braud – photography
 Overdubbed at Gray Matters Studio, Nashville, Tennessee

Charts

References

2013 albums
Jars of Clay albums
Essential Records (Christian) albums
Gray Matters albums
Albums produced by Tucker Martine